Neoachryson castaneum is a species of beetle in the family Cerambycidae, the only species in the genus Neoachryson.

References

Achrysonini